Of the many notable Aberdonians from Aberdeen and Aberdeenshire in Scotland, the film producer and director Ara Paiaya, British Open winning golfer Paul Lawrie and the musician Annie Lennox are the most famous in modern times. However, Aberdeen has produced many earlier important people, such as Thomas Blake Glover, an assisting figure in the foundation of Mitsubishi.

Architecture and design
Ninian Comper (1864–1960), architect
Bill Gibb (1943–1988), fashion designer
James Gibbs (1682–1754), architect
Archibald Simpson (1790–1847), architect, responsible for many Aberdeen buildings
W. Douglas Simpson (1896–1968), architectural scholar and archaeologist
John Smith (1781–1852), architect

Armed forces
David Baird (1757–1829), soldier
James Brooke (1884–1914), recipient of the Victoria Cross
Robert Grierson Combe (1880–1917), recipient of the Victoria Cross 
John Cruickshank (born 1920), recipient of the Victoria Cross
Marion Patterson (born 1920), recipient of the George Medal
John Rennie (1920–1943), acting sergeant, recipient of a posthumous George Cross for gallantry while on training
Archibald Bisset Smith (1878–1917), recipient of the Victoria Cross

Art and sculpture

John Macdonald Aiken (1880–1961), painter and stained-glass artist
Johanna Basford (born 1983), illustrator and textile designer
Alexander Milne Calder (1846–1923), sculptor
Berthe des Clayes (1877–1968), artist
Gertrude des Clayes (1879–1949), portrait painter
William Dyce (1806–1864), artist
George Jamesone (c. 1587–1644), Scotland's first eminent artist
William Keith (1838–1911), landscape artist
Jennifer Lee (born 1956), Scottish ceramic artist
Shona Macdonald, artist, University of Massachusetts Amherst professor
Esther Blaikie MacKinnon (1885–1934), artist
James McBey (1883–1959), artist
Alberto Morrocco (1917–1998), artist and teacher
Stephen Reid (1873–1948), illustrator and painter

Business

William Black (1771–1866), Canadian shipper and merchant
Alexander Blackwell (c. 1700–1747), adventurer
Thomas Blake Glover (1838–1911), trader in Bakumatsu and Meiji era Japan
Robert Gordon (1668–1731), philanthropist and merchant
Stewart Milne (born 1950), businessman and former Aberdeen F.C. chairman
George Smith (1806–1899), financier
Ian Wood, businessman

Literature and journalism
Lord Byron (1788–1824), poet (raised in Aberdeen aged 2–10)
Alexander Chalmers (1759–1834), writer and editor
Simon Farquhar (born 1972), writer
Lewis Grassic Gibbon (1901–1935), author
Richard Gordon (born 1960), BBC Radio Scotland presenter
John Imlah (1799–1846), poet
Angus Konstam (born 1960), writer and historian
Iain Levison (born 1963), novelist and journalist
Lachlan Mackinnon (born 1956), poet and critic
David Masson (1822–1907), author
Arthur Butler Phillips Mee (1860–1926), journalist, historian and astronomer
Lorna Moon (1886–1930), author and screenwriter
Janet Milne Rae (1844–1933), novelist and missionary, born in Willowbank
Alexander Scott (1920–1989), poet in Braid Scots and English
Nan Shepherd (1893–1981), author and poet
Rachel Annand Taylor (1876–1960), poet and critic

Music

Connor Ball (born 1996), bassist of The Vamps
John Black (born 1967), music manager
Yvie Burnett (born 1963), opera singer, vocal coach and TV personality
Ian Campbell (1933–2012), folk musician
Ronald Center (1913–1973), composer
Finlay Dun (1795–1853), musician and collector of Scottish songs
Iona Fyfe (born 1998), award-winning Scots singer and musician
Mary Garden (1874–1967), opera singer
Evelyn Glennie (born 1965), virtuoso percussionist
Calvin Goldspink (born 1989), singer and US-based actor
Jimmy Hastings (born 1938), rock and jazz instrumentalist
Annie Lennox (born 1954), singer
Neil Mackie (born 1946), tenor and professor at Royal College of Music
Alasdair MacLean (born 1974), vocalist and songwriter
Terry McDermott, singer
John McLeod (born 1934), composer
Jimmy Murrison (born 1964), lead guitarist
Pallas (1980 – present), progressive rock band
Stanley Robertson (1940–2009), ballad singer and storyteller
Seb Rochford, drummer
Emeli Sandé (born 1987), singer
The Shamen, electronic dance music band
The Xcerts, band

Politics
Richard Alexander (1934–2008), former MP for Newark
Sir John Anderson (1858–1915), Governor of Straits Settlements
Sir John Arbuthnot, 1st Baronet (1912–1992), politician
Norman Baker, MP for Lewes and former UK government minister
Peter Bevan-Baker (1962–), Canadian politician, the current leader for the PEI Green Party (from 2012), MLA (from 2015), and official opposition leader for Prince Edward Island (from 2019)
Kirsty Blackman, SNP MP for Aberdeen North (from 2015)
William Mortimer Clark (1836–1917), Canadian politician
James Cran, former MP for Beverley, PPS, Maastricht Rebel and Shadow Deputy Leader of the House
Stuart Donaldson, SNP MP for West Aberdeenshire and Kincardine (from 2015)
James Moir Ferres (1813–1870), Upper Canadian politician and journalist
Frank Findlay (1884–1945), New Zealand politician
James Forrester (1937–2011), U.S. politician
Sydney Gardner (1884–1965), Australian politician
Michael Gove (born 1967), Conservative MP and Chancellor of the Duchy of Lancaster
Rosemary Hall (1925–2011), Scottish Nationalist politician
John Hope (1842–1926), Tasmanian politician
Joseph Hunter (1839–1935), Canadian politician and surveyor
William Alexander Hunter (1844–1898), politician and jurist
James Hutchison (1859–1909), Australian politician
Sir William MacGregor (1846–1919), Lieutenant-Governor of British New Guinea, Lieutenant-Governor of Newfoundland and Labrador and Governor of Queensland
Callum McCaig, former MP for Aberdeen South (from 2015-2017)
Donald Melville (1829–1919), Australian politician
Alexander Mitchell (1817–1887), U.S. politician
Robert Morrison, 1st Baron Morrison (1881–1953), British politician and parliamentary private secretary
John Paton (1886–1976), politician and British MP
William Bain Scarth (1837–1902), Canadian politician
Sir Richard Shepherd, MP for Aldridge-Brownhills
Graham Simpson (living), Conservative MSP 
Thomas Smith (1745–1809), U.S. politician
Nicol Stephen, Baron Stephen (born 1960), Deputy First Minister of Scotland and Leader of Scottish Liberal Democrats
John Stevenson, MP for Carlisle
John Strachan, U.S. politician
Ross Thomson (born 1987), politician and former MSP, former Conservative MP for Aberdeen South
Eilidh Whiteford, SNP MP for Banff and Buchan (from 2010)
Dan Crenshaw, U.S politician

Religion
Oswald Chambers (1874–1917), seminarian
Alexander Cruden (1699–1770), theologian
Alexander Ewing (1814–1873), church leader
Rev. John Ferguson (1852–1925), Presbyterian minister and Acting Principal of St Andrew's College at University of Sydney
Alan Main (born 1936), minister and Moderator of the Church of Scotland
Rev. Scott Rennie (born 1972), minister and theologian
John Strachan (1778–1867), first Anglican Bishop of Toronto
William Turner (1844–1914), Roman Catholic Bishop of Galloway (1893–1914)
Alexander Young (died 1684), Bishop of Edinburgh, then of Ross

Scholarship
William Barclay (1546–1608), jurist
John Hill Burton (1809–1881), Historiographer Royal
Nora Griffith (1870-1937), Egyptologist and conservator
Gilbert Jack (c. 1578–1628), Aristotelian philosopher and polymath
Michael Lynch (born 1946), historian
George Croom Robertson (1842–1892), philosopher
Kathleen Stock (born 1972), philosopher

Science and medicine

Terence Cawthorne (1902–1970), ear, nose and throat surgeon, knighted
Sir Andrew Clark, 1st Baronet (1826–1893), physician and pathologist
Sir David Gill (1843–1914), astronomer
David Gregory (1659–1708), astronomer
James Gregory (1638–1675), astronomer and mathematician
James Charles Inglis (1851–1911), civil engineer, knighted
Wilson Jameson (1885–1962), physician
John MacGillivray (1821–1867), naturalist
William MacGillivray (1796–1852), naturalist and ornithologist
Francis Masson (1741–1805), botanist
Robert Morison (1620–1683), botanist and taxonomist

Sports
Russell Anderson (born 1978), footballer
Tim Baillie (born 1979), slalom canoeist and 2012 Olympic gold medal winner
Ian Black, (born 1941), swimmer
George Buchan (born 1950), footballer
Martin Buchan (born 1949), footballer
David Carry (born 1981), swimmer and 2006 Commonwealth gold medal winner
Neil Cochran (born 1965), swimmer and 1984 Olympic bronze medal winner
Rachel Corsie (born 1989), footballer
Peter Craigmyle (1894 – 1979), football referee
Warren Cummings (born 1980), footballer
Chris Cusiter (born 1982), rugby union player
Alex Dawson (born 1940), footballer
Paul Dixon (born 1986), footballer
Neil Fachie (born 1984), athlete and 2012 Paralympic gold medal winner
James Angus Gillan (1885–1981), Olympic rower
John Hewitt (born 1963), footballer and scorer of winning goal in 1983 European Cup Winners' Cup
Stuart Holden (born 1985), footballer who plays for USA
Denis Law (born 1940), footballer
Paul Lawrie (born 1969), golfer
Graham Leggat (1934–2015), footballer and TV presenter
Moray Low (born 1984), rugby union player
Ken Malcolm (1926–2006), footballer
Shaun Maloney (born 1983), footballer (raised in Aberdeen)
Shona Marshall (born 1964), sport shooter
Bobby McDonald (born 1955), footballer
Hannah Miley (born 1989), swimmer and 2010 Commonwealth gold medal winner (raised in Aberdeen)
Willie Moir (1922–1988), footballer
Bill Murray (1901–1961), footballer
John Murray (1873–1916), cricketer
George Mutch (1912–2001), footballer and trainer
David Ojabo (born 2000), American football linebacker (raised in Aberdeen)
Gavin Rae (born 1977), footballer
Richie Ramsay (born 1983), golfer
John Rattray (born 1978), skateboarder
Andy Reid, football player in the 1930s
Robbie Renwick (born 1988), swimmer and 2010 Commonwealth gold medal winner (raised in Aberdeen)
Barry Robson (born 1978), footballer
Andrew Shinnie (born 1989), footballer
Fred Smith (1926–2005), footballer
Neil Simpson (born 1961), footballer (raised in Aberdeenshire)
Jason White (born 1978), rugby union player (raised in Aberdeen)

Stage and screen
Jane Beadon (1913-1999), actress and socialite 
John Henry Anderson (1814–1874), magician
William Devlin (1911–1987), stage, film and TV actor
James Donald (1917–1993), actor
Tunji Kasim (living), actor
Rose Leslie (born 1987), actress
Laurie Macmillan (1947–2001), broadcaster
Laura Main, actress
Scotland the What?, comedy revue act
Michael Sheard (1938–2005), actor
Jeff Stewart (born 1955), actor
Annie Wallace, actress

Others
John Watt Beattie (1859–1930), Tasmanian photographer
William Dove Paterson (1860–1916), entertainer, cinematographer 
Leslie Benzies, video game producer and President of Rockstar North, creators of the critically acclaimed Grand Theft Auto series
Tom Dalgliesh (born 1945), games designer
Juliet-Jane Horne (born 1984), model, Miss Scotland 2000
George Washington Wilson (1823–1892), photographer
Mary Helen Young, (1883–1945), nurse, French Resistance

References

 
Aberdeen
 
Aber